The Meldrum transmitting station is a broadcasting and telecommunications facility, situated on Core Hill,  north-west of the village of Oldmeldrum in Aberdeenshire. It is owned and operated by Arqiva.

History
It was built by J. L. Eve Construction in the mid-1950s, who also built the similar height Divis transmitting station at the same time.

Channels listed by frequency

Analogue radio (VHF FM)

Digital radio (DAB)

Analogue television
405-line monochrome analogue television signals were broadcast from Meldrum from its launch in 1955 until the nationwide shutdown of VHF signals in 1985.

See also
List of masts
List of tallest buildings and structures in Great Britain
List of radio stations in the United Kingdom

References

External links
 Meldrum transmitter at thebigtower.com

Transmitter sites in Scotland